East Fork Deep River is a  long 3rd order tributary to the Deep River in Guilford County, North Carolina.  This stream along the West Fork Deep River forms the Deep River.

Course

Watershed
East Fork Deep River drains  of area, receives about 45.1 in/year of precipitation, and has a wetness index of 444.10 and is about 18% forested.

See also
List of rivers of North Carolina

References

Rivers of North Carolina
Rivers of Guilford County, North Carolina